Herbst is the German word for autumn or fall. 

Herbst may also refer to:

Surnames 
 Christoph Maria Herbst (born 1966), German actor and comedian
 Eduard Herbst (1820–1892), Austrian jurist and statesman
 János Herbst (1956–2015), Hungarian politician
 Jess Herbst (born 1958), American politician
 Johan Herbst (born 1987), South African rugby union player
 Johann Andreas Herbst (1588–1666), German composer
 Johann Friedrich Wilhelm Herbst (1743–1807), German biologist
 John Herbst (disambiguation), multiple people
 Josephine Herbst (1892–1969), American novelist
 Manasse Herbst (1913–1997), Austrian-German actor and singer
 Rebecca Herbst (born 1977), American actress
 Reinfried Herbst (born 1978), Austrian skier
 Riley Herbst (born 1999), American NASCAR driver
 Sabine Herbst (born 1974), German swimmer
 Sharon Tyler Herbst and her husband Ron Herbst (1942–2007), American food and wine authors
 Thomas Herbst (footballer) (born 1962), German footballer and football manager
 Thomas Herbst (painter) (1848-1915), German Impressionist painter
 Torsten Herbst (born 1973), German politician

Other uses 
 Herbst Gaming, gas station and casino operator using the name of "Terrible Herbst"
 Herbst Theatre, an auditorium in the War Memorial and Performing Arts Center in the Civic Center, San Francisco, USA
 Herbst maneuver, an aerobatic maneuver named after Wolfgang Herbst
 Herbst, Indiana, a small town in the United States
 Corpuscles of Herbst, avian mechanoreceptors

German-language surnames
Surnames of German origin
Surnames from nicknames